Lazany may refer to the following places:

Slovakia
 Lazany, Slovakia, village in Prievidza District
 Lažany, village in Prešov District

Poland
 Łażany, Lower Silesian Voivodeship
 Łazany, Lesser Poland Voivodeship

Czech Republic
 Lažany (Blansko District), a municipality and village in the South Moravian Region
 Lažany (Strakonice District), a municipality and village in the South Bohemian Region
 Dolní Lažany, a municipality and village in the Vysočina Region